Leptobrachium guangxiense is a species of frog in the family Megophryidae from China and Vietnam. It has been recorded in Pinglong'ao (平隆), Shangsi County, Guangxi, China, and in Tam Dao National Park, Vietnam.

References

guangxiense
Amphibians described in 2009